Sang Sara (also Romanized as Sang Sarā) is a village in Baladeh Kojur Rural District, in the Central District of Nowshahr County, Mazandaran Province, Iran. At the 2006 census, its population was 733, in 179 families.

References 

Populated places in Nowshahr County